Lamjed Ameur (born 9 February 1990) is a Tunisian footballer who plays for Al-Hilal as a forward.

References

External links
 

1990 births
Living people
Tunisian footballers
Tunisian expatriate footballers
AS Djerba players
CS Hammam-Lif players
US Ben Guerdane players
Sfax Railways Sports players
AS Gabès players
Stade Gabèsien players
JS Kairouan players
Al-Najma SC players
Al-Selmiyah Club players
Al-Hilal SC (Benghazi) players
Tunisian Ligue Professionnelle 1 players
Saudi Second Division players
Expatriate footballers in Saudi Arabia
Expatriate footballers in Libya
Tunisian expatriate sportspeople in Saudi Arabia
Tunisian expatriate sportspeople in Libya
Association football forwards